Sleeping Beauty is an album by jazz composer, bandleader and keyboardist Sun Ra and his Intergalactic Myth Science Solar Arkestra recorded in 1979 and originally released on Ra's Saturn label and rereleased on CD on Art Yard in 2008.

Reception
The Allmusic review by Sean Westergaard awarded the album 4½ stars stating "This is the great late-night Sun Ra chillout album you never knew about. The band had been working in a more groove-oriented setting off and on for over a year, as evidenced by the albums Lanquidity and On Jupiter, with both featuring prominent electric bass and electric guitar".

Track listing
All compositions by Sun Ra
 "Springtime Again" – 9:12  
 "Door of the Cosmos" – 8:53  
 "Sleeping Beauty" – 11:48

Personnel
Sun Ra – piano, electric piano, organ
Michael Ray  – trumpet, flugelhorn
Walter Miller – trumpet
Tony Bethel, Craig Harris – trombone
Vincent Chancey – French horn
Marshall Allen – alto saxophone, flute
John Gilmore – tenor saxophone, percussion 
Danny Ray Thompson – baritone saxophone, flute
Eloe Omoe – bass clarinet, flute
James Jacson – bassoon, flute, percussion
Disco Kid – electric guitar
Richard Williams – electric bass
Harry Wilson – vibraphone
Atakatune – percussion
Luqman Ali – drums
June Tyson and the band – vocals

References 

Sun Ra albums
El Saturn Records albums
1979 albums